The Children's Village, formerly the New York Juvenile Asylum, is a private, non-profit residential treatment facility and school for troubled children. It was founded in 1851 by 24 citizens of New York who were concerned about growing numbers of street children in New York.  The necessity for such an institution was first proposed by the Association for Improving the Condition of the Poor, which helped to get it started.

Purpose
Hundreds of homeless and runaway children were present on the streets of New York at the time, and many of them were arrested every year. As part of its mission "to care for, train, and morally uplift a mixed group of the City's poor children," the New York Juvenile Asylum provided housing, education, and reform for those children, and eventually placed them in apprenticeships. It provided a non-punitive alternative for children who had been arrested, and taught disobedient or unoccupied children "self-discipline of body, mind, and heart." In its earliest days it was not particularly effective, and became primarily a place to house disruptive children.

The mission and purpose of the Children's Village has evolved from its origins in the 1800s, and it now exists to "work in partnership with families to help society's most vulnerable children so that they become educationally proficient, economically productive, and socially responsible members of their communities."

History

The original charter for the school was drafted in 1850. After some initial fundraising difficulties, the school was opened in a rented building on January 10, 1853. Early on, the asylum was able to house 400 students, who received six hours of schooling a day, plus other types of instruction, such as vocational education. The school also participated in the orphan train program between 1855 and 1903, placing 6,323 children with families throughout the Midwest, notably Illinois.

In 1854 property was purchased in Washington Heights. This property consisted of 23 acres, and later expanded to 29. This campus had 1,200 beds, although it averaged 582 children per year between 1871 and 1879. The original plan called for two separate facilities: a House of Reception where children would be initially sent by authorities and would be fed, bathed, and housed, while an investigation occurred to determine if there were family who would care for them, and the Asylum, where students would be housed long-term.  A massive building of blue granite was constructed on 175th Street between 10th and 11th Avenues, and opened in 1856. It was described as being "somewhat too prison-like in appearance." An 1860 New York Times article said, "It has a front of 150 feet, two wings, each 75 feet in length and 46 in breadth, and a central extension, 82 feet deep and 43 feet in width. A brick wall incloses play-grounds for both sexes."

Children were committed to the asylum for a variety of reasons, and included children whose parents were incarcerated, whose parents considered them to be "bad" and beyond their control, who had been sustaining themselves by begging, and who were truants, homeless, or thieves. The asylum was designed to provide such children a home, not to be a prison. The facility was racially integrated in 1860.

In 1901, in the face of rising property values, the Washington Heights site was sold and 277 acres were purchased in Dobbs Ferry, New York, in Westchester County. The new location was intended to be more homelike than the granite building in Washington Heights had been. Instead of dormitories housing 50–75 students, it featured cottages arranged around a central quad. At one point there were more than 40 buildings, including not only cottages and classroom buildings, but also workshops and a printing shop.  This design won a gold medal for architecture at the St. Louis World's Fair in 1904. 

The new facility was designed to be a therapeutic community. The number of children housed and cared for was reduced from an average of 582 per year between 1871 and 1879 to 300 in the new facility, where living arrangements were modeled on typical family life; married couples lived with and cared for the children. It was at this time that the facility was renamed "The Children's Village". Children did not stay at the facility indefinitely; after 6–12 months they were returned to their families or placed in foster care.  

There was a new focus on mental health and social work in the 1920s, with the Children's Village becoming the first residential treatment center in the country to have an on-site psychiatric clinic and a social work training school.

The New York Juvenile Asylum and its later incarnation, the Children's Village, saw much success and praise, with many students going on to lead successful lives.  However, the Children's Village also saw criticism for its institutional model, artificial environment, and practice of mixing "virtuous" children from broken homes with children who had been arrested for criminal activity.

In the 1970s and 1980s the racial makeup of the Children's Asylum shifted, with an increasing proportion of African-American students. The median age dropped to 12, and students remained at the facility longer, often for several years.

In the 1990s there was a rise in opposition to residential and institutional facilities nationwide. Many were forced to close. The Children's Village saw its funding, both from government and from private donors, decrease, and it had to tap into its endowment to remain afloat. The Children's Village revamped its treatment procedures in light of increased criticism of the residential model. There was an increased focus on treating children's behavioral and emotional problems and preparing them for reintegration with either their families and communities, or a foster home. This re-vamped model resulted in increased funding, both governmental and by private donors, and allowed the Children's Village to increase the number of children it was able to help per year from 5,000 under the old model, to 10,000 in the new one.

Services
As of 2015, the Children's Village serves over 10,000 children per year. 425 students are accommodated in the residential school in Dobbs Ferry, New York. It also provides services to children in areas such as:

Immigration services
Foster care
Family preservation
Short-term shelters and housing
Community outreach programs
A multi-generational community center

Summer camps
Affordable housing
Crisis services
Day students
Daycare

References
Explanatory notes

Citations

External links

Greenburgh, New York
Schools in Westchester County, New York
Educational institutions established in 1851
1851 establishments in New York (state)